Division General Michał Janiszewski (15 June 1926 – 3 February 2016) was a Polish officer and public official.

A close aide of General Wojciech Jaruzelski, he served for a number of years as his chief of cabinet. First when Jaruzelski was Minister of Defense (1972–1981). When Jaruzelski became a Prime Minister in 1981, Janiszewski was a head of the office of the Council of Ministers under him and two next Prime Ministers - Zbigniew Messner and Mieczysław Rakowski.

After Jaruzelski was elected President, Janiszewski became first chief of the Office of the President of the Republic of Poland (until December 1989 People's Republic of Poland). He was a chief of the office from September 1989 until Jaruzelski stepped down on 22 December 1990.

Janiszewski was also a member of the Military Council of National Salvation (1981–1983).

References

1926 births
2016 deaths
Polish generals
Politicians from Poznań
People from Poznań Voivodeship (1921–1939)
Commanders of the Order of Polonia Restituta
Recipients of the Order of the Banner of Work
Recipients of the Order of Friendship of Peoples